Thomas Burns Hetherington was an English professional footballer who played as a goalkeeper.

References

English footballers
Association football goalkeepers
Burnley F.C. players
Barnsley F.C. players
Gateshead F.C. players
Walker Celtic F.C. players
English Football League players
1911 births
1968 deaths
Jarrow F.C. players